Dalieba (Dungan:Да леба) or Lieba is a Chinese bread similar to Russian rye bread available in Northeast China.

Russian influence in Northeast China

Northeast China, at one time known as Manchuria, was considerably influenced by Russian culture, as Russians came there to build and manage East Chinese Railway in the 1890s, to work in the leased territory of Lushun and Dalian in 1898–1904, and to occupy that area at the end of the Second World War and in its aftermath.

The Russian influence on the cuisine of Northeast China may be observed in Dalieba bread and Hongchang sausage.

Dalieba bread
Dalieba is Chinese bread that is made to resemble Russia's rye bread in theory, and is so named from Da which means "Big" in Chinese, and Хлеб which means "Bread" in Russian. It is made from wheat flour, instead of ryeflour. Its taste is somewhat sweet.

Dalieba is available in large cities of Northeast China, such as Harbin, Changchun, Shenyang and Dalian, as nostalgic food to some people. Dalieba made by Qiulin Group is considered "authentic", and is also shipped to other cities.

See also
Rye bread/Black bread
Qiulin Group
Northeast China

References

External links
 Savoring Daliaba and Hongchang at Qiulin Department Store/品嚐大列巴與裡道斯 (YouTube) (in Cantonese)

Chinese breads
Northeast China
Manchuria